Edinboro Fighting Scots    

Shawn Bunch (born March 19, 1983) is an American mixed martial artist who competed in Bellator's bantamweight division.

Wrestling career
Bunch competed in high school for Leavenworth High School and in university for Edinboro University of Pennsylvania, where he was a four-time NCAA qualifier and two-time All-American. In June 2012, he lost to Coleman Scott at a wrestle-off, which decided the final Olympic roster spot.

Mixed martial arts career

Bellator MMA
Bunch made his professional and promotional debut on November 30, 2012 at Bellator 82 against Chad Coon. He won via unanimous decision (30-27, 30-27, 30-27).

Bunch was expected to face Steve Garcia on July 31, 2013 at Bellator 97. However, Garcia was replaced by Russell Wilson due to injury. Bunch defeated Wilson via split decision (29-28 Bunch, 29-28 Wilson, 29-28 Bunch).

Bunch/Garcia eventually took place on October 25, 2013 at Bellator 105. He had his first mixed martial arts defeat via TKO in the third round.

After a long layoff, Bunch faced David Duran at Bellator 127 on October 3, 2014. He won the fight via KO in the first round.

Bunch faced Rolando Perez at Bellator 137 on May 15, 2015. He won the fight by unanimous decision.

Bunch next faced Darrion Caldwell at Bellator 143 on September 25, 2015.  He lost the fight via submission in the first round.

Bellator MMA announced on October 27, 2020, that Bunch had been released from the promotion.

Post-Bellator career
After the release, Bunch signed with UAE Warriors and faced Rany Saadeh at UAE Warriors 22 on September 4, 2021. Bunch won the bout via split decision.

Bunch faced Firdavs Khasanov on January 28, 2022 at Eagle FC 44. He won the bout via unanimous decision.

Bunch faced Adi Alić on May 20, 2022 at Eagle FC 47. He lost the fight via unanimous decision.

Championships and accomplishments

Amateur wrestling
 FILA/USA Wrestling (Freestyle wrestling)
 World Olympic Games Qualifying Tournament: 3rd place (2012)
 Pan American Olympic Qualifying Tournament: 3rd place (2012)
 Pan American Championships: Gold medal (2007)
 USA Open: Champion (2010)
 USA Open: Runner-up (2011)
 USA Nationals: Champion (2008)
 USA Nationals: 3rd place (2007)
 USA Olympic Team Trials: Runner-up (2008)
 USA World Team Trials: Champion (2009)
 USA World Team Trials: Runner-up (2011)
 USA World Team Trials: Runner-up (2010)
 USA World Team Trials: 4th place (2007)
 National Collegiate Athletic Association
 NCAA Division I All-American out of Edinboro University (2005–06)
 NCAA Division I 133 lb: Runner-up out of Edinboro University (2005)
 NCAA Division I 133 lb: 3rd place out of Edinboro University (2006)
 Four-time NCAA Division I qualifier (2002–03, 2005–06)

Mixed martial arts
 Conquer Fighting Championships
 Fight of the Night (1 Time)

Mixed martial arts record

|-
|Loss
|align=center|11–6
|Adi Alić
|Decision (unanimous)
|Eagle FC 47
|
|align=center|3
|align=center|5:00
|Miami, Florida, United States
|
|-
|Win
|align=center|11–5
|Firdavs Khasanov
|Decision (unanimous)
|Eagle FC 44
|
|align=center|3
|align=center|5:00
|Miami, Florida, United States
|
|-
|Win
|align=center|10–5
|Rany Saadeh
|Decision (split)
|UAE Warriors 22
|
|align=center|3
|align=center|5:00
|Abu Dhabi, United Arab Emirates
|
|-
|Loss
|align=center|9–5
|Keith Lee
|Decision (unanimous) 
|Bellator 239
|
|align=center|3
|align=center|5:00
|Thackerville, Oklahoma, United States
|
|-
|Loss
|align=center|9–4
|Leandro Higo
|Submission (guillotine choke)
|Bellator 228
|
|align=center|2
|align=center|4:34
|Inglewood, California, United States
|
|-
|Win
|align=center|9–3
|Dominic Mazzotta
|Decision (unanimous)
|Bellator 219
|
|align=center|3
|align=center|5:00
|Temecula, California, United States
|
|-
|Win
|align=center|8–3
|Joe Warren
|TKO (submission to punches)
|Bellator 210
|
|align=center|1
|align=center|1:42
|Thackerville, Oklahoma, United States
|
|-
| Win
| align=center | 7–3
| Rodrigo Lima		
| Decision (unanimous)
| Conquer Fighting Championships 4
| 
| align=center | 3
| align=center | 5:00
|  Richmond, California United States
|
|-
| Win
| align=center | 6–3
| Josh San Diego	
| Decision (unanimous)
| Dragon House 24
| 
| align=center | 3
| align=center | 5:00
|  San Francisco, California United States
|
|-
| Win
| align=center | 5–3
| Khomkrit Niimi
| TKO (punches)
| Conquer Fighting Championships 2
| 
| align=center | 1
| align=center | 3:37
|  Richmond, California United States
|
|-
| Loss
| align=center | 4–3
| Stephan Cervantes
| Decision (split)
| Conquer Fighting Championships 1
| 
| align=center | 3
| align=center | 5:00
|  Richmond, California United States
| Fight of the Night
|-
| Loss
| align=center | 4–2
| Darrion Caldwell
| Submission (rear-naked choke)
| Bellator 143
| 
| align=center | 1
| align=center | 2:35
| Hidalgo, Texas, United States
|
|-
| Win
| align=center | 4–1
| Rolando Perez
| Decision (unanimous)
| Bellator 137
| 
| align=center | 3
| align=center | 5:00
| Temecula, California, United States
|
|-
| Win
| align=center | 3–1
| David Duran
| TKO (punches)
| Bellator 127
| 
| align=center | 1
| align=center | 3:11
| Temecula, California, United States
|
|-
| Loss
| align=center | 2–1
| Steve Garcia
| TKO (punches)
| Bellator 105
| 
| align=center | 3
| align=center | 3:29
| Rio Rancho, New Mexico, United States
|
|-
| Win
| align=center | 2–0
| Russell Wilson
| Decision (split)
| Bellator 97
| 
| align=center | 3
| align=center | 5:00
| Rio Rancho, New Mexico, United States
|
|-
| Win
| align=center | 1–0
| Chad Coon
| Decision (unanimous)
| Bellator 82
| 
| align=center | 3
| align=center | 5:00
| Mount Pleasant, Michigan, United States
|

References

1983 births
Living people
Sportspeople from Leavenworth, Kansas
American male mixed martial artists
Mixed martial artists from Kansas
Bantamweight mixed martial artists
Mixed martial artists utilizing collegiate wrestling
Mixed martial artists utilizing freestyle wrestling
Edinboro University of Pennsylvania alumni
American male sport wrestlers
African-American sport wrestlers
Amateur wrestlers